The 1956 San Francisco 49ers season was the team's seventh season in the National Football League (NFL), and was coming off a 4–8–0 record, finishing in 5th place in the Western Conference.

San Francisco brought in a new head coach for the second straight season, replacing Red Strader with former 49ers quarterback Frankie Albert, who played with the team from their AAFC days in 1946 until 1952.

The Niners got off to a rough start, winning only 1 of their first 7 games to sit in last place in the Western Conference. San Francisco went unbeaten in their final 5 games, and finished the year with a 5–6–1 record, and in 3rd place in the Conference.

Offensively, Y. A. Tittle threw for a team-high 1,641 yards and 7 touchdowns, and had 56.9% of his passes completed. Hugh McElhenny rushed for a team-best 916 yards and 8 touchdowns, while Billy Wilson caught a club-high 60 receptions for 889 yards, along with 5 touchdowns. Bob St. Clair blocked 10 field goal attempts.

Offseason

NFL Draft

Regular season

Schedule

Standings

References

SHRP Sports
Database Football

San Francisco 49ers seasons
San Francisco 49ers